= AMBUCS =

American non-profit organization

National AMBUCS, Inc.
- Founded: May 18, 1922
- Founder: William L. White
- Purpose: Community Service
- Location: High Point, North Carolina
- Origins: Birmingham, Alabama
- Region served: United States
- Employees: 12
- Volunteers: 5,000 AMBUCS members
- Website: ambucs.org

National AMBUCS, Inc. is a national 501(c)(3) charitable organization. The mission of AMBUCS is "inspiring mobility & independence".

The AMBUCS mission is fulfilled by members of over 160 local chapters who:

- Provide Amtryke adaptive tricycles
- Provide educational scholarships to therapists, and
- Perform various other forms of Community Service

Many AMBUCS members consider involvement with the organization a fun way to serve in their community.

The organization's parent activities are mainly focused on training, supporting, and providing resources for the subsidiary chapters, who deliver program services. A total of 10 staff persons support nearly 5,000 volunteer members from the AMBUCS Resource Center in High Point, North Carolina.

== Amtryke Adaptive Tricycles ==
The Amtryke Program provides Amtryke adaptive tricycles to people in all fifty states. Each year, chapters provide around 3,500 Amtrykes to riders in local communities. Since its inception, about 40,000 Amtrykes have been provided.

== Scholarships for Therapists ==
The Scholarships for Therapists Program awarded more than 15,500 educational scholarships since 1955 to students studying for careers in physical therapy, occupational therapy, and speech language pathology and hearing audiology. Over $8.9 million has been awarded.

== Community service ==
In addition, chapters reported 69,042 hours and $822,285 spent yearly on community service alone (excluding nationwide programs). Chapter community service takes many forms but often includes building home access ramps or accessible playgrounds.
